This is a list of protected areas in Kosovo which includes 2 national parks, 11 nature reserves, 99 natural monuments and 3 protected landscapes. The national policy for governing and management of the national parks is implemented by the Ministry of Environment and Spatial Planning.

List of national parks in Kosovo

List of nature reserves in Kosovo

See also 
 
 Geography of Kosovo
 Biodiversity of Kosovo

References 

 
Kosovo
National parks
Protected areas